Mary of Burgundy, Duchess of Cleves (1393 – 30 October 1466) was the second child of John the Fearless and Margaret of Bavaria, and an elder sister of Philip the Good. 

Born in Dijon, she became the second wife of Adolph, Count of Mark in May 1406. He was made the 1st Duke of Cleves in 1417. They were the grandparents of King Louis XII of France and the great-grandparents of John III, Duke of Cleves, father of Anne of Cleves, who was fourth Queen consort of Henry VIII of England. By their daughter, Catherine, they were ancestors of Mary, Queen of Scots.

The Duke and Duchess of Cleves lived at Wijnendale Castle in West Flanders. She died in Cleves in present-day Monterberg, Kalkar.

Influence
At the death of Adolph of Cleves in 1448, his son John I of Cleves succeeded him. Mary retired to Monterberg Castle, near Kalkar. Returning from a trip to the Middle East in 1449, John visited the Benedictine monastery of Bologna and decided with his mother to found a similar monastery in Kalkar, which would be built to house a dozen monks. Construction began in 1453 and was complete by 1457. The buildings housed numerous works of art and a large library. After secularization in 1802, the church and most of the buildings were demolished, works of art spread throughout the surrounding churches, notably in the Church of St. Nicholas in Kalkar. From the monastery only a part of a wall remains.

The city was driven by development of the wool weaving industry. The wealthy bourgeois and the presence of the nobility in the person of Mary attracted artists, solicited for their works in oils and clay. The Kalkar church, completed in 1450, and the monastery, were the subject of many decorations. The city became, until the early sixteenth century, the center of a school of sculpture including Heinrich Douvermann. Further, scientists like Konrad Heresbach, counselor of the Dukes of Cleves, humanist, lawyer, educator and farmer, periodically resided in Kalkar. This flourishing period ended in the mid-sixteenth century, when, after the fall of weaving activities, epidemics of plague decimated the population.

Issue 

Margaret (23 February 1416 – 20 May 1444), married first William III, Duke of Bavaria on 11 May 1433, second Ulrich V, Count of Württemberg on 29 January 1441
Catherine of Cleves (25 May 1417 – 10 February 1479); married on 23 July 1423 Arnold, Duke of Guelders, mother of Mary of Guelders, Queen consort of Scotland
John I, Duke of Cleves (16 February 1419 – 5 September 1481); married on 22 April 1455 Elizabeth of Nevers
Elisabeth of Cleves (1 October 1420 – March 1488); married on 15 July 1434 Henry XXVI of Schwarzburg-Blankenburg (1418–1488)
Agnes of Cleves (1422 – 6 April 1446); married on 30 September 1439 Charles IV, King of Navarre
Helen of Cleves (1423–1471); married on 12 February 1436 Henry "the Peaceful", Duke of Brunswick-Lüneburg (c. 1411–1473)
Adolph of Cleves, Lord of Ravenstein (1425–1492); married on 13 May 1453 Beatrice of Portugal (1435–1462), daughter of Peter, Duke of Coimbra
Marie of Cleves (1426–1487); married on 27 November 1440 Charles, Duke of Orléans. Mother of Louis XII, King of France

Ancestry

References

Further reading
Early Netherlandish painting: its origins and character, Volume 2, Erwin Panofsky, 1971

1393 births
1466 deaths
Countesses of Cleves
Duchesses of Cleves
Countesses of Mark
House of Valois-Burgundy
People from Dijon
14th-century French women
15th-century French women
14th-century French people
15th-century French people